Dragon Age is a fantasy media franchise created by Canadian writer David Gaider and video game developer BioWare, and owned and published by Electronic Arts. Central to the Dragon Age franchise are the main series of multi-platform role-playing video games: Dragon Age: Origins, Dragon Age II, and Dragon Age: Inquisition. Each game features a different protagonist and plot, but is linked by a common setting, the fictional world of Thedas, as well as several recurring elements and supporting characters. A fourth main series game was announced by BioWare in December 2018, and is currently under development as of 2020. The Dragon Age franchise also includes spin-off games, each with a different gameplay style: two flash games developed by EA2D; a mobile collectible card game developed by EA Capital Games; and a resource management browser game developed by Failbetter Games.

The Dragon Age video games have been influential and successful; the release of the first main series game in 2009 was credited for contributing towards a resurgence in popularity for western role-playing video games and inspiring imitators, while Inquisition won multiple Game of The Year awards and is the most successful video game launch in BioWare history based on units sold. Besides video games, this list covers associated media produced or endorsed by BioWare, or the intellectual property owner Electronic Arts, which includes novelizations, comics, tabletop role playing adaptation source material, an anime film, soundtrack albums, and other media.

Video games

Main series

Other games

Printed media

Books

Comics

Tabletop role-playing game

Film and television

Soundtracks

Other media

References

External links
 

Dragon Age
Dragon Age
Dragon Age media